Andrzej Ancuta (1919–2009) was a Polish cinematographer. Ancuta participated in the Warsaw Uprising against the German occupation during the Second World War. He worked on several post-war films such as Three Women (1957). He later taught cinematography at the National Film School in Łódź.

Selected filmography
 Warsaw Premiere (1951)

References

Bibliography 
 Haltof, Marek. Polish Film and the Holocaust: Politics and Memory. Berghahn Books, 2012.

External links 
 

1919 births
2009 deaths
Polish cinematographers
Film people from Minsk